"Green Grass of Tunnel" is a song by experimental Icelandic musical group múm, released prior to their 2002 album Finally We Are No One as a single. The song was covered by British Sea Power on their 2005 single "It Ended on an Oily Stage". Pitchfork Media listed it 484th on its countdown of the Top 500 tracks of the 2000s.

Track listing
 "Green Grass of Tunnel" (Album Version) — 4:58
 "In Through the Lamp" — 5:55
 "Green Grass of Tunnel" (Video Version, Promo only) — 4:13

Label: FatCat (cd7fat06 / 7fat06) 
Format: 3"CD / 7"

Music video

The music video was created in computer graphics by Semiconductor's Joe Gerhardt and Ruth Jarman. It follows the view of a flock of birds, and presents a lighthouse, presumably very similar to the house in which they stayed. Brad Osborn has noted how the craggy, icy peaks depicted in the video are linked to the pentatonic leaps in the lead vocal melody, and also to the cold, metallic timbres used in the recording.

References

2002 songs
2002 singles
Múm songs